St. Roch's Secondary School is a Roman Catholic secondary school located in Royston, Glasgow. It is named for the Christian Saint Roch.

Notable alumni
 Willie Bain - Labour Member of Parliament for Glasgow North East
 Mo Johnston - Celtic, Rangers, Nantes, Scotland football player, first high-profile Catholic to play for Rangers post-World War II
 Stevie Chalmers - Celtic, Partick Thistle and Scotland - a member of the Lisbon Lions team that won the European Cup

References

External links
St Roch's Secondary's page on Scottish Schools Online

Catholic secondary schools in Glasgow
Springburn